Percival v Wright [1902] 2 Ch 401 is a UK company law case concerning directors' duties, holding that directors only owe duties of loyalty to the company, and not to individual shareholders. This is now codified in the United Kingdom's Companies Act 2006, section 170.

Facts
Shareholders in Nixon's Navigation Co. wanted to sell their shares, and requested that the company's secretary find purchasers. Some directors of the company purchased the shares at £12.10s per share, which price was based upon independent valuation. After the sale, the shareholders discovered that before and during the negotiations for that sale, the board of directors had been involved in other negotiations to sell the entire company, which would have made those shares substantially more valuable had they come to fruition. The plaintiff sued, claiming breach of fiduciary duty, in that the shareholders should have been told of these negotiations.

Judgment
Swinfen Eady J held the directors owed duties to the company and not shareholders individually.

Significance

However, it has been distinguished in at least two subsequent cases.  In Coleman v Myers [1977] 2 NZLR 225 and Peskin v Anderson [2001] BCLC 372 the court described this as being the general rule, but one which may be subject to exceptions where the circumstances are such that a director may owe a greater duty to an individual shareholder, such as when that shareholder is known to be relying upon the director for guidance, or where the shareholder is a vulnerable person.

See also
UK company law
Johnson v Gore Wood & Co

Notes

United Kingdom company case law
High Court of Justice cases
1902 in case law
1902 in British law